Stephen H. Kessler (born 1935) is a person who was known as the "LSD Killer".

Education
He attended Harvard College and graduated class of '57, and was enrolled in Downstate Medical School in 1964, but was asked to leave because of his unstable behaviour.

Trial
He was arrested in April 1966 and tried for murder in October, having apparently stabbed his mother-in-law 105 times. Headlines trumpeted him as a "Mad LSD Slayer" and "LSD Killer", based on a statement made during his arrest that he had been "flying for three days on LSD". His LSD usage, a month prior, was not mentioned during the trial proceedings. His drug use was revealed as having been "one-and-a-half grains of phenobarbital" and "three quarts of lab alcohol".

Psychiatrists testified that he actually had chronic paranoid schizophrenia and he was found not guilty by reason of insanity.

See also
Maurice Edelbaum, one of Kessler's lawyers

References

External links 
 
 
 

1935 births
Living people
Harvard College alumni
Harvard Medical School alumni
SUNY Downstate Medical Center alumni